KWRQ (102.3 FM, "Sunny 102.3") is a radio station licensed to serve Clifton, Arizona, United States. The station is owned by Double-R-Communications LLC. It airs a Hot Adult Contemporary music format.

The station was assigned the KWRQ call letters by the Federal Communications Commission on November 1, 1995.

References

External links
 KWRQ official website
 

WRQ
Hot adult contemporary radio stations in the United States
Greenlee County, Arizona